Double Shot is a type of amusement ride manufactured by S&S - Sansei Technologies.

The ride is a drop tower type attraction that uses compressed air to rapidly propel riders up the tower then gently lower them with a series of air-cushioned bounces back to the loading platform.

The ride is very similar to the Space Shot ride, also manufactured by S&S, but the Double Shot features an extra "shot" while riders are falling down after the first one.

Statistics
 Ride Speed: 30–35 miles per hour (50-55 kilometers per hour)
 Capacity: 12-16 per tower
 Ride duration: 40 seconds
 Height: Varies from 80 feet to over 125 feet

Locations

Standard 85 ft Rides
Canobie Lake Park, Salem, New Hampshire, USA
Keansburg Amusement Park, Keansburg, New Jersey, USA
Playland, Rye, New York, USA
 Playland's Castaway Cove, Ocean City, New Jersey, USA
Wild Adventures, Valdosta, Georgia, USA
 Silver Dollar City, Branson, Missouri, USA

Other rides
Double Shot, 125 ft, located at Santa Cruz Beach Boardwalk, Santa Cruz, California, USA
Shore Shot, 125 ft, located at Casino Pier, Seaside Heights, New Jersey, USA
Brain Drain - relocated at Wild Waves and Enchanted Village, Federal Way, Washington, USA
Dragons Tower - located at Castle Park, Riverside, California, USA
Liberty Launch - located at Holiday World, Santa Claus, Indiana, USA,
Tårngyset - located at Bakken, Denmark
Free Fall - located at Showcenter Haedo, Buenos Aires, Argentina (Defunct)
Space Shot (2) - Approx 120 ft, located at Galaxyland, West Edmonton Mall, Edmonton, Alberta, Canada
Starblaster - located at Canobie Lake Park, Salem, New Hampshire, USA
Pemburu Badai, 125 ft, located at Trans Studio Bandung, Bandung, West Java, Indonesia
Dare 2 Drop, 131 ft, located at Imagicaa, Khopoli, India
Hershey Triple Tower, located at Hersheypark, Hershey, Pennsylvania, USA

References

External links
 Official website
 Spec Sheet PDF of the Double Shot Tower Ride

Drop tower rides
S&S – Sansei Technologies
Amusement rides manufactured by S&S – Sansei Technologies